This is a list of books which talk about things related to current day physics or physics as it would be in the future.
There a number of books that have been penned about specific physics concepts, e.g. quantum mechanics or kinematics, and many other books which discuss physics in general, i.e. not focussing on a single topic. There are also books that encourage beginners to enjoy physics by making them look at it from different angles.

 
Boks
Lists of books